
The following list of Carnegie libraries in the United States provides detailed information on public Carnegie libraries in each state or other territory in the United States, including the number of Carnegie libraries in that state, and the earliest and latest dates of grant award. Click on the state name to go to a detailed listing of the individual Carnegie libraries in that state (divided into public and academic sections). Note that Alaska and Delaware have no Carnegie libraries, and are thus not included in the table.

Detail table

 A:  Owing to confusion from Old Colorado City's incorporation into Colorado Springs, Jones counts a library twice and reports this figure as 36.
 B:  Bobinski and Miller do not list Gardiner as having received a full grant because its grant was to complete an unfinished building (noted in Anderson and Miller); Anderson and Jones include it.
 C:  Jones erroneously reports this number as 64, while Bobinski reports the number of grants at 58. However, all four references list 65 libraries in their gazetteers; Anderson, Jones, and Miller list 57 grants.
 D:  No reference tallies this number correctly for the public libraries. The amount is reported as $962,475 by Anderson, who for unknown reasons omits Walker from his list. Bobinski and Miller list Walker, but sum to $969,375. However, their gazetteers sum to $968,975 which, when added to $30,000 grant for the academic library in Saint Paul, confirms the above figure.
 E:  Bobinski and Miller do not list Orange's library in summary tables, but note in their full listings that the community received a small grant toward the purchase of a branch library.
 F:  Bobinski and Miller summarize 105 Ohio libraries, though Miller's summary details 107. Jones, who investigated the branch libraries of Cleveland and Cincinnati, arrives at 106, the most authoritative number.
 G:  This figure includes the cost of the central library in Pittsburgh, which Miller does not include.
 H:  Bobinski and Miller claim there are just 43 libraries in Washington but detail 44 in their summary tables, which matches the other references.

Map
Alternately, click on the state in the map below to go to the list of Carnegie libraries in that state.

Notes

References
 
 
 
 
Note: The above references, while all authoritative, are not entirely mutually consistent. Some details of this list may have been drawn from one of the references without support from the others. Reader discretion is advised.

 

Carnegie